Herbert H. Kohl (born February 7, 1935) is an American businessman and politician. Alongside his brother and father, the Kohl family created the Kohl's department stores chain, of which Kohl went on to be president and CEO. Kohl also served as a United States senator from Wisconsin from 1989 to 2013 as a member of the Democratic Party. He chose not to seek re-election in 2012 and was succeeded by fellow Democrat Tammy Baldwin. Kohl is also the former owner of the Milwaukee Bucks of the National Basketball Association.

Early life, education, and career
Kohl was born and raised in Milwaukee, the son of Mary (née Hiken) and Max Kohl. His father was a Polish Jewish immigrant and his mother was a Russian Jewish immigrant. He attended Washington High School. He earned a Bachelor of Science degree from the University of Wisconsin in 1956 and a Master of Business Administration degree from Harvard Business School in 1958. While an undergraduate, he joined the Pi Lambda Phi fraternity. He was also a roommate of Major League Baseball Commissioner Bud Selig. Between 1958 and 1964, Kohl was a member of the United States Army Reserve.

After finishing graduate school, Kohl worked as an investor in real estate and the stock market, eventually spinning off his own company, Kohl Investments, to manage these assets. He and his brother became heir to a family-owned chain that included 50 grocery stores and several department stores, pharmacies and liquor stores. In 1970, Kohl was named president of Kohl's and served until the corporation was sold to BATUS Inc. (formerly British American Tobacco).

Early political career
Kohl served as chairman of the Wisconsin Democratic Party between 1975 and 1977.

U.S. Senate

Committee assignments
 Committee on Appropriations
 Subcommittee on Agriculture, Rural Development, Food and Drug Administration, and Related Agencies (Chairman)
 Subcommittee on Commerce, Justice, Science, and Related Agencies
 Subcommittee on Defense
 Subcommittee on Interior, Environment, and Related Agencies
 Subcommittee on Labor, Health and Human Services, Education, and Related Agencies
 Subcommittee on Transportation, Housing and Urban Development, and Related Agencies
 Committee on Banking, Housing, Urban Affairs
 Subcommittee on Housing, Transportation, and Community Development
 Subcommittee on Financial Institutions
 Subcommittee on Security and International Trade and Finance
 Committee on the Judiciary (Vice Chairman)
Subcommittee on Antitrust, Competition Policy and Consumer Rights (Chairman)
 Subcommittee on Crime and Drugs
 Subcommittee on Terrorism, Technology and Homeland Security
 Special Committee on Aging (Chairman)

Political positions
Kohl has been described as a populist-leaning liberal.

Kohl supported President Barack Obama's health reform legislation; he voted for the Patient Protection and Affordable Care Act in December 2009, and he voted for the Health Care and Education Reconciliation Act of 2010.

Fiscal policy
He has voted in favor of most lawsuit reform measures as well as for rules tightening personal bankruptcy. He has long supported amending the U.S. Constitution to require a balanced budget. He was one of the few Democrats to vote for the tax cut passed in 2001, and he also supported the elimination of the "marriage penalty". Despite these views, he has been seen as generally supportive of progressive taxation. Like many moderate Democrats, he voted in favor of the welfare reform measures in the mid-1990s. He is also not opposed to the creation of individual, private savings accounts to supplement Social Security.

Kohl has generally had a pro-environmental record and has been an outspoken proponent of American energy independence. He supports increased production of hydrogen cars, establishing a federal goal for reducing oil consumption by 40 percent, and disallowing oil speculation in protected areas. However, he has voted against Corporate Average Fuel Economy standards. Kohl has been rated highly by groups that desire universal health care. He has voted in favor of expanding Medicare and SCHIP and has desired that prescription drugs be included under federal health coverage. During his 2006 re-election campaign, Kohl advocated that HMOs be placed under more scrutiny in order to determine if they're effectively delivering care.

Social policy
Kohl is strongly pro-choice and opposes the death penalty. He is highly in favor of affirmative action and supports setting aside funds for women and minorities. Although he voted in favor of the 1996 Defense of Marriage Act, Kohl rejected the proposal to amend the U.S. Constitution to define marriage as between one man and one woman and has supported measures that ban discrimination based on sexual orientation. Kohl has consistently voted against the flag desecration amendment and in recent years has voted against restrictions on travel to Cuba and funding for TV Martí. In 2005, he secured a victory for one of his main causes: requiring handguns to be sold with child safety locks. The amendment was attached to the Protection of Lawful Commerce in Arms Act, with every Democrat and many Republicans voting in favor of the amendment. Earlier in his career, he helped push the Gun-Free Schools Act which the U.S. Supreme Court overturned in 1995 and has submitted many amendments to that effect. He is a strong supporter of public education and has rejected school vouchers. Kohl has voted in favor of allowing for the establishment of educational savings accounts.

Foreign policy
Kohl has voted against many free trade agreements including the North American Free Trade Agreement (NAFTA) and more recently the Central America Free Trade Agreement (CAFTA) and voted against the Freedom to Farm Act in 1996. However, he has also supported fast-tracking trade normalization with China and establishing free trade with some smaller countries of the developing world. He voted against authorizing the Gulf War in 1990; however, he voted in 2002 to authorize military force in Iraq. Kohl has voted on a number of occasions with more liberal Democrats to reduce military spending, voting against 1996 defense appropriations increases and supporting a veto of funding new military projects. Despite having been among the 98 U.S. senators who voted for the PATRIOT Act, Kohl subsequently opposed this legislation and has voted to require warrants for wiretapping or the detention of prisoners.

Political campaigns
Kohl won election to the U.S. Senate in 1988 with his trademark catchphrase "Nobody's Senator But Yours". He was re-elected in 1994, 2000 and 2006. He did not seek re-election in 2012.

Electoral history

Personal life
Kohl is the wealthiest resident of Milwaukee, the richest Jewish American from Wisconsin, and was one of the wealthiest U.S. senators. In 2016, Forbes estimated Kohl's net worth to be around $630 million to $1.5 billion.

On May 13, 2011, Kohl announced he would not run for re-election in 2012, saying, "The office doesn't belong to me. It belongs to the people of Wisconsin, and there is something to be said for not staying in office too long."

Kohl purchased the Milwaukee Bucks from Jim Fitzgerald in 1985 for $18 million to ensure the team remained in Milwaukee. In 2003, he considered an offer to sell the team to former NBA superstar Michael Jordan, but decided to retain ownership. On April 16, 2014, Kohl agreed to sell the Bucks for $550 million to New York-based billionaires Wesley Edens and Marc Lasry. Kohl was elected to the Wisconsin Athletic Hall of Fame in 2007. On July 22, 2021, Kohl was the key figure of the lead car in the Milwaukee Bucks NBA Championship parade. On the event, he said "This is one of the big days of my life." Kohl attended the Bucks' 2021-22 season opener at Fiserv Forum and was presented with a Bucks championship ring for his efforts in keeping the Bucks in Milwaukee.

Philanthropy 
Kohl donated $25 million to the University of Wisconsin–Madison for construction of its new sports arena, which was named the Kohl Center. In 1990, Kohl established the Herb Kohl Educational Foundation Achievement Award Program, which provides annual grants totaling $400,000 to 200 graduating seniors, 100 teachers and 100 schools throughout Wisconsin. In 2016, he gave $1.5 million to the La Follette School of Public Affairs to create the Herb Kohl Public Service Research Competition, promoting public policy research.

See also
List of Jewish members of the United States Congress
List of richest American politicians

References

External links
 Herb Kohl Educational Foundation

 

|-

|-

|-

|-

|-

1935 births
Living people
20th-century American politicians
21st-century American politicians
American businesspeople in retailing
American philanthropists
American Ashkenazi Jews
Businesspeople from Milwaukee
Democratic Party of Wisconsin chairs
Democratic Party United States senators from Wisconsin
Harvard Business School alumni
Jewish American people in Wisconsin politics
Jewish American philanthropists
Jewish United States senators
Milwaukee Bucks executives
National Basketball Association owners
Politicians from Milwaukee
Military personnel from Milwaukee
United States Army reservists
University of Wisconsin–Madison alumni
Wisconsin Democrats
21st-century American Jews